Livingston County is a county in the U.S. state of Michigan. As of the 2020 Census, the population was 193,866. It is part of the Detroit-Warren-Dearborn, MI Metropolitan Statistical Area.
The county seat and most populous city is Howell. The county was platted in 1833, but for three years remained assigned to Shiawassee and Washtenaw counties for revenue, taxation and judicial matters. It was formally organized in 1836. As one of Michigan's "Cabinet counties", a group of ten counties whose names honor members of President Andrew Jackson's Cabinet, it is named after former US Secretary of State Edward Livingston.
Livingston County's location in Southeast Michigan offers residents relatively convenient access to the metropolitan centers of Detroit, Lansing, Ann Arbor, and Flint. Livingston County residents regularly commute to those centers, using the three major expressways which pass through the county: I-96, US 23, and M-59.
Although continuing to be composed largely of bedroom communities, the county is experiencing and maintaining significant growth in both the service and industrial economic sectors. Major employers include Tribar, PepsiCo, Citizens Insurance, and ThaiSummit. The Brighton Recreation Area is in the county.

Geography

Adjacent counties

 Shiawassee County – northwest
 Genesee County - northeast
 Oakland County - east
 Washtenaw County - south
 Jackson County - southwest
 Ingham County – west

Demographics

As of the 2000 United States Census, of 2010, the county had 180,967 people, 55,384 households, and 43,531 families. There were 58,919 housing units at an average density of 104 per square mile (40/km2). 96.7% of the population were White, 0.8% Asian, 0.4% Black or African American, 0.4% Native American, 0.4% of some other race and 1.3% of two or more races. 1.9% were Hispanic or Latino (of any race). 20.8% were of German, 11.2% Irish, 10.6% English, 10.6% Polish, 6.5% American, 5.2% Italian and 5.1% French, French Canadian or Cajun ancestry. 95.9% spoke English and 1.7% Spanish as their first language.

There were 55,384 households, of which 39.80% had children under the age of 18 living with them, 68.50% were married couples living together, 6.80% had a female householder with no husband present, and 21.40% were non-families. 17.10% of all households were made up of individuals, and 5.40% had someone living alone who was 65 years of age or older. The average household size was 2.80 and the average family size was 3.18.

28.80% of the county's population was under age 18, 6.60% was from age 18 to 24, 31.70% was from age 25 to 44, 24.60% was from age 45 to 64, and 8.30% was age 65 or older. The median age was 36 years. For every 100 females, there were 102.10 males. For every 100 females age 18 and over, there were 99.70 males.

With a median household income of $67,400 (2008 estimate - $72,700) and a median family income of $75,284, Livingston County is the 88th highest-income county in the United States and has the second-highest median income in Michigan (after Oakland) in 2010. Males had a median income of $54,358 versus $32,073 for females. The county's per capita income was $28,069. About 2.40% of families and 3.40% of the population were below the poverty line, including 3.60% of those under age 18 and 4.50% of those age 65 or over.

More than 50% of the county's population resides in the southeastern communities of Brighton Township, Genoa Township, Hamburg Township, Green Oak Township, the Village of Pinckney, Putnam Township and the city of Brighton.

The US Census Bureau in 2000 identified Brighton, Howell and the nearby city of South Lyon to be a contiguously urbanized area, one of the newest such areas in the United States.

The 2019 Population Estimates Table from the United States Census Bureau cited an estimate of 191,995 residents in Livingston County in 2019.

Media
There are two local newspapers, the Livingston County Daily Press & Argus, owned by Gannett Company, and The Community Journal, which is an independently owned weekly.

The Daily Press & Argus, which publishes daily except Saturday, was launched in 2000 through the combination of two weekly newspapers, The Livingston County Press and The Brighton Argus, which served the communities for many decades.

The Community Journal was launched in February 2010 by Steve Horton and Buddy Moorehouse, two veteran newspapermen. It publishes Tuesdays, covering Pinckney, Fowlerville, and the Howell areas. Its editor is Stephenie Koehn. The Journal is published along with the Fowlerville News and Views, which has been published for 25 years by Horton and his wife Dawn.

A weekly all-local paper,The Livingston Community News, was launched in May 2003 with offices in downtown Brighton and was closed in July 2009 when "The Ann Arbor News, the newspaper's parent company, ceased publication. Community Journal editor Koehn was a reporter with The Livingston Community News.

Other media in the county include WHMI-FM, a Classic Hits radio station that has local news on the hour, and www.LivingstonTalk.com, a web-based product launched in the fall of 2009 by Moorehouse and fellow veteran journalist Maria Stuart. Moorehouse and Stuart previously worked as editors for a combined 45 years at the Daily Press and Argus.

The Marketeer is a free monthly magazine that is mailed to more than 42,000 in Livingston County. Its content is primarily advertising from local businesses plus articles and information about people and community events. The Marketeer has been published by George Moses Company since 1974.

Politics
Livingston County falls entirely within Michigan's 8th Congressional district, and is currently represented by Democrat Elissa Slotkin, who defeated Republican Mike Bishop in the 2018 election. However, Livingston County has been reliably Republican since its founding. Since 1884, the Republican Party nominee has carried 83% of the Presidential elections (29 of 35).

County government
The county government operates the jail, maintains rural roads, operates the major local courts, records deeds, mortgages, and vital records, administers public health regulations, and participates with the state in the provision of social services. The county board of commissioners controls the budget and has limited authority to make laws or ordinances. In Michigan, most local government functions – police and fire, building and zoning, tax assessment, street maintenance, etc. – are the responsibility of individual cities and townships.

Elected officials

 Prosecuting Attorney: David Reader
 Sheriff: Michael Murphy 
 County Clerk: Elizabeth Hundley
 County Treasurer: Jennifer Nash
 Register of Deeds: Brandon Denby 
 Drain Commissioner: Brian Jonckheere

(information as of May 2019)

Transportation

Major highways
 – runs ESE and SE through central part of county, passing Fowlerville, Howell, Brighton.
 – business loop through central Howell, parallel to and on the north side of I96. Length 7.6 miles (12 km).
 – runs north–south through eastern part of county, passing Hartland, Brighton, Whitmore Lake.
 - runs east and SE through lower part of county, passing Pinckney and Hamburg, to intersection with US23 north of Whitmore Lake.
 – runs west from east county line to intersection with I96, 3.4 miles (5.4 km) WNW of Howell.
 – enters west line of county near SW corner. Runs east and NE to intersection with M36, 3 miles (4.5 km) inside county border.
 – runs south from Pinckney 2.3 miles (3.8 km) to intersection with N. Territorial Road.

Communities

Cities
Brighton
Fenton (partial)
Howell (county seat)

Villages
Fowlerville
Pinckney

Charter townships
Brighton Charter Township
Genoa Charter Township
Green Oak Charter Township

Civil townships

Cohoctah Township
Conway Township
Deerfield Township
Hamburg Township
Handy Township
Hartland Township
Howell Township
Iosco Township
Marion Township
Oceola Township
Putnam Township
Tyrone Township
Unadilla Township

Census-designated places
 Hartland
 Whitmore Lake (partial)

Other unincorporated communities

 Anderson
 Bullis Crossing
 Chalkerville
 Chilson
 Cohoctah
 Cohoctah Center
 Deer Creek
 Deerfield Center
 Fleming
 Green Oak
 Gregory
 Hallers Corners
 Hamburg
 Hell
 Island Lake
 Kaiserville
 Lakeland
 Nicholson (partial)
 Oak Grove
 Parkers Corners
 Parshallville
 Plainfield
 Pettysville
 Rushton
 Tyrone Center
 Unadilla
 Williamsville

See also

 List of Michigan State Historic Sites in Livingston County, Michigan
National Register of Historic Places listings in Livingston County, Michigan

References

 https://www.webcitation.org/60AF2rwbi?url=http://quickfacts.census.gov/qfd/states/26/26093.html

External links
Livingston County official website

 
Michigan counties
Metro Detroit
1836 establishments in Michigan Territory
Populated places established in 1836